The 1991 Copa América football tournament was hosted by Chile, from 6 to 21 July. It was organized by CONMEBOL and all ten member nations participated.

Until the 2021 edition, this was the last time that the tournament consisted of only CONMEBOL member nations. In later tournaments, at least two nations from outside CONMEBOL have been invited to bring the total number of participants to twelve.

Argentina won the Copa América for the 13th time, their first since 1959.

Venues

Squads
For a complete list of all participating squads: 1991 Copa América squads

First round

The tournament was set up in two groups of five teams each. Each team played one match against each of the other teams within the same group. The top two teams in each group advanced to the final stage.

Two points were awarded for a win, one point for a draw, and no points for a loss.

 Tie-breaker
 If teams finish leveled on points, the following tie-breakers are used:
 greater goal difference in all group games;
 greater number of goals scored in all group games;
 winner of the head-to-head match between the teams in question;
 drawing of lots.

Group A

Group B

Final round

Result

Goal scorers
With six goals, Gabriel Batistuta was the top scorer in the tournament. In total, 73 goals were scored by 42 different players, with two of them credited as own goals.

References

External links
 Copa América 1991 at RSSSF

 
1991 in South American football
Copa América tournaments
Amer
International association football competitions hosted by Chile
July 1991 sports events in South America
Sports competitions in Santiago
1990s in Santiago, Chile
Concepción, Chile
Sport in Valparaíso Region